Pratighatana is a 1985 Indian Telugu-language action drama film written and directed by T. Krishna. The film is produced by Ramoji Rao under Ushakiran Movies. The plot follows a woman's fight against corruption and criminalization of politics in India. The film starts Vijayshanti alongside Chandra Mohan, Kota Srinivasa Rao, Sai Kumar, P. L. Narayana, Charan Raj, Suthi Velu, Rajasekhar, Narra Venkateswara Rao, and Y. Vijaya who appear in supporting roles. Music is composed by K. Chakravarthy.

The film is released on 11 October 1985. It was premiered at International Film Festival of India and has garnered the Filmfare Best Film Award (Telugu). The film won six Nandi Awards and two Filmfare Awards South (including Best Film –Telugu). The film was dubbed and released in Tamil as Poo Ondru Puyalanathu. Later it was remade in Malayalam as Pakarathinu Pakaram and in Hindi as Pratighaat while Charan Raj reprise his role in  Hindi.

Plot
Jhansi, wife of a lawyer Gopalakrishna, works as a college lecturer. The city life was always disrupted by a group of street criminals supported by the ruling party. These criminals humiliate Jhansi in front of a large crowd by showing her nude on the street when she refuses to take back her complaint against the criminal Kali for murdering a police officer in public. Her husband remains helpless despite being a lawyer fearing of the consequences that they may face in future if they went to court for justice. Meanwhile, the leader of the criminals, the villain, gets elected to the legislative assembly and arranges an open meeting to celebrate his election. Jhansi kills the villain in that open meeting.

Cast 
 Vijayashanti as Jhansi, a college lecturer
 Chandra Mohan as Gopala Krishna, a lawyer
 Rajasekhar as Prakash, a police officer
 Charan Raj as Kalidasu, a criminal
 Kota Srinivasa Rao as a politician
 Rallapalli, a lawyer of Kali
 Suthivelu as Srisailam, a police constable
 Y. Vijaya
 Chitti Babu
 Narra Venkateswara Rao
 Vizag Prasad

Soundtrack

Features
The film was a big hit at the box office and brought fame to T. Krishna and Vijayshanti.
This film was later remade in Hindi as Pratighaat (1987) starred by Sujata Mehta and Nana Patekar.

Awards
Filmfare Awards South
 Filmfare Best Film Award (Telugu) - Ramoji Rao
 Filmfare Best Actress Award (Telugu) - Vijayashanti

Nandi Awards
 Best Actress - Vijayashanti
 Best Villain - Charan Raj.
 Best Female Playback Singer - S. Janaki .
 Best Story Writer - T. Krishna.
 Best Dialogue Writer - M. V. S. Haranatha Rao
 Special Jury Award - Kota Srinivasa Rao

References

External links
 

1985 films
Indian action drama films
1980s Telugu-language films
Films scored by K. Chakravarthy
Films about corruption in India
Telugu films remade in other languages
Films directed by T. Krishna
1980s action drama films